Lloyd Buonconsiglio, known professionally as Ian Lloyd, is an American rock singer and songwriter best known as the lead singer of the band Stories. The band's  single "Brother Louie" rose to No. 1 on the U.S. Billboard Hot 100 chart in August 1973.

In 1971, Michael Brown and Ian Lloyd formed Stories. They released two albums (Stories and About Us) with a handful of Billboard Top 100 charting singles. Brown left before the band recorded their third (and final) album, Traveling Underground, which was released under the name, Ian Lloyd and Stories, and included the Billboard #50 hit "Mammy Blue". After Stories, he pursued a solo career, with six albums to his credit. Lloyd has performed with numerous recording artists, assuming the role of a session musician. His long discography of work includes background vocal work with artists such as Foreigner, Billy Joel, Peter Frampton, and Yes. Lloyd continues to record, perform, and write, his most recent release being "Everybody's Happy 'Cause It's Christmas Time".

Stories

Although Lloyd was classically trained on both piano and violin, he first reached international acclaim as lead singer for the band Stories, formed with Michael Brown of the Left Banke in the early 1970s. Lloyd  sang lead on Stories' songs like "I'm Coming Home" (played as an anthem during the return of the Iranian hostages), "Mammy Blue" and "Brother Louie". A re-recorded version of the latter with Lloyd on vocals is used as the theme song for Louis CK's comedy series Louie.

Rolling Stone praised Lloyd's songwriting, saying he displayed "a lyricist's most essential gift — the ability to produce a verbal approximation of the music's ambiance.".

As a solo artist

After a successful run, Stories disbanded and Lloyd pursued a solo career. His albums were well received, in particular his 1976 eponymous debut. 1979's Goose Bumps produced the hit "Slip Away", written by Ric Ocasek of The Cars. 1980's Third Wave Civilization  included Lloyd's version of Bryan Adams' 1983 hit "Straight from the Heart".

As a backing vocalist

As a backup singer, Lloyd worked with numerous major recording artists, most notably Foreigner, who used Lloyd's vocals on hits like "Feels Like the First Time", "Cold as Ice", "Waiting for a Girl Like You", "Juke Box Hero", and "Double Vision". Lloyd can also be heard on Billy Joel’s "I Go to Extremes", as well as tracks by Yes, Peter Frampton, Survivor, and Ian McDonald.

The Ian Lloyd Band and Social Hero

In addition to projects of his own, Ian Lloyd has been a member of New York rock act Social Hero since 1998, performing alongside his son, frontman David Lloyd.  He contributed vocals to Social Hero's first album, The Famous, released in 2009.

Lloyd continues to reside in New York City. His group, the Ian Lloyd Band, is composed of Ian Lloyd, David Lloyd (Keyboards+backing vocals), Matt Grossman/Dan Natelli (guitars), Antti Janhunen (bass), and Jon Ihle (drums). In addition to their own material, their repertoire consists of Stories' music and songs from Lloyd's solo catalogue.

2015 Tour with The Left Banke

On March 18, 2015, it was announced that Ian Lloyd would be joining his Stories bandmate Michael Brown's former group, The Left Banke, which included George Cameron, on a 2015 co-headline tour in North America. The Left Banke's original lead singer Steve Martin Caro never rejoined the touring version of the band as was advertised. Lloyd performs a mixture of solo material and classic material from his time with Stories.

Other work

He wrote songs for Elkie Brooks's 1975 album, Rich Man's Woman.

Discography

Albums

Solo albums
 1976 Ian Lloyd (Polydor)
 1979 Goose Bumps (Scotti Bros. Records)
 1979 Love Stealer (Scotti Bros. Records, Japan version of "Goose Bumps")
 1980 3WC* (aka "Third Wave Civilization") (Scotti Bros. Records)
 1997 Planet X (Efa Records)
 2009 In The Land of O-de-Po (Machine Dream)

With Stories
 1972 Stories (Kama Sutra) #182 released June 1972
 1973 About Us (Kama Sutra) #29 (charted after it was reissued with "Brother Louie" added to the end of side two)
 1973 Traveling Underground (Kama Sutra) #208

With Fast Forward
1984 Living in Fiction

Singles

Solo singles
1976 "Never Been A Man" b/w "Silver Chains" (Polydor)
1976 "Oh Let Me In" b/w "Sensations" (Polydor)
1976 "Silver Chains" b/w "Never Been A Man" (Polydor, New Zealand release)
1979 "She Broke Your Heart" b/w "Easy Money" (Scotti Bros. Records)
1979 "Slip Away" b/w "Easy Money" (Scotti Bros. Records)
1979 "Goosebumps" b/w "Slip Away" (Scotti Bros. Records)
1979 "Love Stealer" b/w "Slip Away" (Scotti Bros. Records)
1980 "Do You Wanna Touch (Oh Yeah)" b/w "Stop In The Name Of Love" (Scotti Bros. Records)
1980 "Straight From The Heart" b/w "Third Wave Civilization" (Scotti Bros. Records)
1983 "Stop In The Name Of Love" b/w "Dedicated To You" (Scotti Bros. Records, Germany release)
2010 "Everybody's Happy 'Cause It's Christmas Time" (Machine Dream)

With Stories
1972 "I'm Coming Home" b/w "You Told Me" (Kama Sutra 545)  #42
1972 "Top of the City" b/w "Step Back" (Kama Sutra 558)
1973 "Darling"(see below) b/w "Take Cover" (Kama Sutra 566) #111
1973 "Love Is In Motion" b/w "Changes Have Begun" (Kama Sutra 574)
1973 "Brother Louie" b/w "What Comes After?" (Kama Sutra 577) #1
1973 "Mammy Blue" b/w "Travelling Underground" (Kama Sutra 584) #50
1974 "If It Feels Good, Do It" b/w "Circles" (Kama Sutra 588) #88
1974 "Another Love" b/w "Love Is In Motion" (Kama Sutra 594)

References

External links
Ian Lloyd homepage
Social Hero homepage
[ Allmusic discography]
Ian Lloyd Bandcamp

1947 births
Living people
Musicians from Seattle
American male singers
American session musicians
Singers from Washington (state)